Live from the TCM Classic Film Festival is a television documentary series broadcast on Turner Classic Movies in the United States. Each episode features an in-depth interview with a famous actor concerning his life and career, taped in front of a live audience during the TCM Classic Film Festival and broadcast the following year.

Episodes
Luise Rainer (2010). The interview conducted by Robert Osborne was broadcast on January 12, 2011.
Peter O'Toole (2011). The interview conducted by Robert Osborne was broadcast on April 12, 2012.
Kim Novak (2012). The interview conducted by Robert Osborne was broadcast on March 3, 2013.
Eva Marie Saint (2013). The interview conducted by Robert Osborne was broadcast on March 31, 2014.
Alan Arkin (2014). The interview conducted by Robert Osborne was broadcast on March 24, 2015.
Sophia Loren (2015). The interview conducted by Edoardo Ponti was broadcast on April 24, 2016.
Faye Dunaway (2016). The interview conducted by Ben Mankiewicz was broadcast on April 3, 2017.
Michael Douglas (2017). The interview conducted by Ben Mankiewicz and will be broadcast on TCM in 2018.

References

Turner Classic Movies original programming
2010s American documentary television series
2010 American television series debuts
2018 American television series endings